Andrew King (14 September 1948) is an English Labour Party politician.

He was educated at Coatbridge Technical College and Hatfield Polytechnic, he worked as a postman and mechanic before becoming a social services manager. He was Member of Parliament for Rugby and Kenilworth until 2005, having first won the seat in the 1997 general election. King lost his parliamentary seat at the 2005 general election to the Conservative Party candidate, Jeremy Wright.

For the 2010 election, Parliamentary constituency boundaries were redrawn, and Rugby became a seat in its own right. On 22 July 2007, King was selected by the Rugby Constituency Labour Party as their prospective parliamentary candidate for the 2010 general election, however, King lost the new Rugby seat to Mark Pawsey, son of former MP Jim Pawsey, whom King had defeated in 1997.

References

External links
 

1948 births
Living people
British people of Scottish descent
British Roman Catholics
Labour Party (UK) MPs for English constituencies
People from Warwickshire
UK MPs 1997–2001
UK MPs 2001–2005